Vagad (also known as Vagar, Hindi: वागड) is a region in southeastern Rajasthan state of western India. Its boundaries are roughly defined by those of the districts of Dungarpur and Banswara. Major cities of the region are Dungarpur and Banswara.

Geography
Vagad is bounded on the north by Mewar region of Rajasthan, on the southeast and eastby Malwa region of Madhya Pradesh, and on the west and southwest by Gujarat state. The region mostly lies in the upper watershed of the Mahi River and its tributaries, which is said to be the lifeline of Vagad. The Mahi flows north through the district (Banswara) from its origin in the Vindhya Range of Madhya Pradesh, entering the district (Banswara) from the southeast and flowing north towards the northern end of the district, where it turns southwest to form the boundary between Banswara and Dungarpur districts before entering Gujarat and emptying into the Gulf of Cambay.

Vagad has rich flora and fauna. The forests include mainly teak. The wildlife includes a large variety of wild animals such as the leopard and the chinkara. Common birds in the region include fowl, partridge, black drongo, grey shrike, green bee-eater, bulbul and parrot. Some of the towns in this region are Aspur, Bhiluda, Simalwada, Sagwara, Partapur, Bagidra and Garhi.

History

Parmar rulers held Vagar during the 11th century with their political center at Arthuna (in present-day Banswara district). Vagad as a different region separated from Mewar, and a branch of Guhilot Rajput ruled here  

All princely states were merged into Rajasthan prior to 1947.

References

External links
 Rural Images of Vagad

Regions of Rajasthan